Reina de Reinas (Eng.: "Queen of Queens") is the second major label studio album released by Regional Mexican singer Jenni Rivera on August 3, 1999 by Sony Music. It was re-released by Cintas Acuario in 2008.

Track listing

References

 
 

1999 albums
Jenni Rivera albums
Fonovisa Records albums